Sara Catherine Nathan (born 16 February 1956) is a former British broadcaster who now sits on the  boards of a number of public bodies.

Early life and education

Nathan was educated at Wimbledon High School, Cambridge University and Stanford University which she attended on a Harkness Fellowship. Her college at Cambridge was New Hall and she was vice-president of the Cambridge Union.

Career

Broadcasting
Nathan was a BBC journalist for 15 years on Newsnight, Breakfast Time and The Money Programme. She was on the launch team for Radio 5 Live and was the first editor of its morning programme. After that she became Britain's first female editor of a TV network news programme when she became editor of Channel 4 News in 1995, a post she held until 1997.

She was a member of the Radio Authority from 1999 to 2003, a founder board member of Ofcom, where her term ended at the end of 2007, and was an Editorial Adviser to the BBC Trust from January 2008 until its abolition in 2016. She has also served on the board of ATVOD, the regulatory agency designated by Ofcom as the "co-regulator" of television on demand. Nathan was a Senior Hearings Manager in BBC HR – mostly working on Equal Pay – from November 2018 to August 2019.

Other roles
She was a member of the Human Fertilisation and Embryology Authority and of the Professional Conduct Committee of the Bar Council. She was a Commissioner for the Marshall Scholarships until December 2006. She was on the Regulatory Decision Committee of the Financial Services Authority from 2001 to 2007, and was a member of the ICSTIS PhonepayPlus Committee (which regulates premium rate telephony) until November 2008.  She chaired The Animal Procedures Committee, a body that advises the British Home Secretary on matters related to animal experimentation in the UK, until its abolition in 2012. She was a lay member of the Judicial Appointments Commission from January 2006 to January 2012.

From April 2012 to 2016 she was a Public Appointments Assessor, chairing the appointment of Chairs of public bodies, reporting to David Normington, the First Civil Service Commissioner, and a Chair of disciplinary hearings for the Nursing and Midwifery Council. She was a member of the board of the Solicitors' Regulation Authority from 2010 to 2015. She was also a trustee of Why Me?, a charity promoting restorative justice.

In 2015, Nathan co-founded a charity Refugees at Home, which finds hosts in Britain for destitute asylum-seekers and refugees. She has since hosted 27 refugees (as of October 2021) from many countries including Syria, Sudan, Eritrea, Ethiopia, Iran, Afghanistan and Egypt. The charity has made over 2,500 placements and hosted for over 195,000 individual person nights.

She was a tribunal chair for the Nursing and Midwifery Council until April 2020.
She has been a tribunal chair for Social Work England since December 2019. In 2020 she joined the Queen's Counsel Appointments Panel and became chair of the appointments board for the Accountants' Regulatory Board at the ICAEW. She is also a lay assessor for GLA public appointments but that is largely inactive.

Honours
She was awarded an OBE in the Queen's Birthday Honours, announced on 14 June 2008.

Personal life
She lives in Acton, London, with her husband, the composer and now-retired director of music at the Yehudi Menuhin School, Malcolm Singer. They have two adult children and two grandchildren.

References 

1956 births
Living people
Alumni of New Hall, Cambridge
BBC people
BBC Radio 5 Live
British radio journalists
British women television journalists
English broadcasters
English television journalists
English women journalists
Harkness Fellows
Officers of the Order of the British Empire
People educated at Wimbledon High School
People from Acton, London
Stanford University alumni
British women radio presenters